Ascuns novel cases de le ans et temps le Roy H. VIII., Edv. VI, and la Roygne Mary. Escrie ex la graund Abridgment, compose per Sir Robert Brooke, Chivaler, &c., la, disperse en les Titles; mes icy collect sub ans is the title of a collection of law reports, compiled by Richard Bellewe, of cases decided between approximately 1515 and 1558. They are reprinted in volume 73 of the English Reports.

J. G. Marvin said:

He said of "Bellewe's Cases":

John Bouvier said:

For the purpose of citation, the name "Brook's New Cases" may be abbreviated to "B N C".

This collection is commonly known as "Petit Brooke" and "Petty Brook". It is also cited as "Bellewe's Cases temp. Henry VIII".

References
Ascuns novel cases de le ans et temps le Roy H. VIII., Edv. VI, and la Roygne Mary. Escrie ex la graund Abridgment, compose per Sir Robert Brooke, Chivaler, &c., la, disperse en les Titles; mes icy collect sub ans. 12mo. London. 1628.

External links
Brooke, R and Bellewe, R and March, J. Sir Robert Brooke's New Cases with March's Translation. 1578. Reprinted by Steven and Haynes in 1873. Digitised copy from Google Books.

Sets of reports reprinted in the English Reports
Court of Common Pleas (England)